Weixi Lisu Autonomous County 
(Lisu: ꓪꓰꓲ-ꓫꓲꓸ ꓡꓲ-ꓢꓴ ꓫꓵꓽ ꓝꓲꓸ ꓛꓬꓽ ꓫꓯꓽ ) is located in Dêqên Prefecture, in the northwest of Yunnan Province, China.

Administrative divisions
Weixi Lisu Autonomous County has 3 towns and 7 townships. 
3 towns
 Baohe
 Yezhi
 Tacheng
7 townships

Climate

References

External links
Weixi County Official Website

County-level divisions of Dêqên Tibetan Autonomous Prefecture
Lisu people
Autonomous counties of the People's Republic of China